Isabella M. Gioia is an Italian astrophysicist. She is currently a Research Associate at INAF in Bologna, Italy. 


Career 

While a visiting astronomer at the University of Hawaii Institute for Astronomy, she was a member of the Chandra Science Center.  As of 2012, she had been a member of the American Astronomical Society for 25 years.  She was included in the 1996-1997 edition of Who's Who in Science and Engineering.  She was listed in ISI's 1120 World's Most Cited Physicists (1981-1997) with 65 articles, 2397 citations, and an average of 36.88 citations per article as of the time of publication.

References 

Astrophysics
Italian women physicists
University_of_Bologna_alumni
Year of birth missing (living people)
Living people